The Nights were an American soul funk band produced by H.B. Barnum. The band produced only one self-titled album in 1976 and then disbanded. Members included Anthony Brahum, Ira Clark, Anthony Williams, Dennis Hagger, Joey L. Mingo, Rickey Blain, and Vincent Rocto.

Discography
The Nights, album	ABC Records		1976		
Singles: 
"Country Girl" / "Let There Be Love"  	ABC Records		1976		
"(When You Dropped Your Guard) Love Knocked You Down" / "Let There Be Love" (7")	Little Star Records	LS-1577	1976

References

American soul musical groups
American funk musical groups